Lääne County ( or Läänemaa, literally "Western land";) is one of 15 counties of Estonia. It is located in western Estonia and borders the Baltic Sea to the north, Harju County to the north-east, Rapla County to the east, Pärnu County to the south, and the island counties of Saare and Hiiu to the west. In January 2009 Lääne County had a population of 23,810 – constituting 2.0% of the total population in Estonia.

County government 
The County Government is led by a governor, who is appointed by the Government of Estonia for a term of five years. Since 15 December 2011, the governorship has been held by Innar Mäesalu.

Maavanem 1918–1941
Aleksander Saar 1917–1927
Artur Kasterpalu 1930–1941

Maavanem 1993–present
 Andres Lipstok 14 December 1993 – 12 August 1994
 Hannes Danilov 1 November 1994 – 3 January 1999
 Arder Väli 23 February 1999 – 20 July 1999
 Jaanus Sahk 22 September 1999 – 22 September 2004
 Sulev Vare 19 November 2004 – 14 September 2007
 Neeme Suur 18 February 2008 – 4 April 2011
 Innar Mäesalu 15 December 2011 -

Municipalities
The county is subdivided into municipalities. There is one urban municipality, Haapsalu ( – town) and 2 rural municipalities ( – parishes) in Lääne County.

Religion

History 

In the first centuries AD political and administrative subdivisions began to emerge in Estonia. Two larger subdivisions appeared: the parish and the county. A parish consisted of several villages. Nearly all parishes had at least one fortress. The defense of the local area was directed by the highest official, the parish elder. A county was composed of several parishes, also headed by an elder. By the 13th century the following major districts had developed in Estonia: Saaremaa (Osilia), Läänemaa (Rotalia or Maritima), Harjumaa (Harria), Rävala (Revalia), Virumaa (Vironia), Järvamaa (Jervia), Sakala (Saccala), and Ugandi (Ugaunia).

Läänemaa (Low German: Wiek) was an independent country on the east coast of the Baltic sea, bordered by Revala, Harjumaa, Alempois, and Sakala. Läänemaa had an area of approximately 1900 hides. Early in 1220 troops from Sweden, initially led by King John I, had invaded Läänemaa. The Swedish army took the Lihula stronghold and set up a small garrison. Swedish Jarl Karl Döve and Bishop Karl Magnusson of Linköping, both from the powerful House of Bjelbo, also remained in the castle. On August 8, 1220 the united Œselian and Rotalian armies encircled the castle at dawn. It was set ablaze in the course of the fierce battle that ensued. The Swedish troops tried to make their way out, but were killed on site apart from a few who succeeded in escaping to Tallinn, held by Denmark. The Jarl, the Bishop, and almost 500 other Swedes were killed, leaving no Swedish presence in Estonia at all. The short-lived Swedish attempt to gain foothold in Estonia was motivated by the quickly advancing Danish and Low German crusaders who had been able to conquer most of the area in the early 13th century. Defeat in the Battle of Lihula discouraged the Swedish expansion to Estonia for more than 300 years, and the country was left for the Teutonic Knights, Low German Bishops and Denmark to divide. In the meantime, Sweden focused on Finland and the Swedish-Novgorodian Wars. After the Livonian Crusade Läänemaa became the main territory of The Bishopric of Ösel-Wiek, an independent Bishopric. Parts of the Bishop's castle are still preserved in Haapsalu.

Historic parishes (kihelkonnad)
Hanila
Cozzo (Karuse)
Corbe (Kõrve)
Lihula
Ridala
Soontagana (:et:Soontagana)
around Märjamaa

After the German conquest in 1227, Lääne County became the center of the Bishopric of Ösel-Wiek, an independent principality within the Livonian Confederation. Parts of Bishop's castle are still preserved in Haapsalu.

Gallery

See also 
 Matsalu National Park

References

External links 

Läänemaa Portal (in Estonian)
Lääne County Government Official website (in Estonian)

 
1224 disestablishments
Counties of Estonia